Bulimba is an electoral district of the Legislative Assembly in the Australian state of Queensland.

The electorate covers the inner eastern suburbs of Brisbane.  It is bounded on the north and the west by the Brisbane River and, as at the 2009 election, covers the suburbs of Bulimba, Balmoral, Cannon Hill, Hawthorne, Morningside, Norman Park, Murarrie and Seven Hills. The boundaries have changed relatively little since 1923; prior to that, the boundaries extended as far east as Wynnum and as far south-east as Mount Gravatt and Cleveland.

History
Bulimba has existed continuously since the 1873 election, originally covering most of the outer south-east of Brisbane.

Since the 1923 redistribution, Bulimba has strongly supported Labor. The Labor Party (ALP) held the seat on all but six terms and, of those, 3 were held by an independent Labor candidate and one by a member of the Queensland Labor Party. As a measure of how strongly pro-Labor the seat has been, it was one of the eleven seats Labor retained in the Coalition landslide of 1974, at which Labor was cut down to a "cricket team" of only 11 members.

In the 1929 election Bulimba returned Queensland's first woman Member of the Queensland Legislative Assembly (MLA), Irene Longman of the Country and Progressive National Party, for one term.

Although ALP candidate Robert Gardner was elected in Bulimba in the 1950 election, the close result caused close scrutiny of the votes and revealed that fraudulent votes had been cast in Gardner's favour. The election was ruled void, but Gardner himself was cleared of any involvement in the fraud. The scandal and the investigations into the fraud continued for many months. Finally, a by-election was held on 14 April 1951 (almost 12 months after the original election) with the ballot boxes under police guard. Gardner won the by-election by a narrow margin.

Prior to the 1957 election, Gardner and 21 other Labor MLAs under the leadership of Premier Vince Gair left the ALP to form the Queensland Labor Party (QLP). Gardner was defeated by Jack Houston of the regular ALP, who held the seat until 1980 and was the state's Opposition Leader from 1966 until 1974.

In the 2012 election, Liberal National candidate Aaron Dillaway was elected. In the 2015 election, Bulimba was the most marginal seat held by the LNP and was regained by Di Farmer of the ALP.

Members for Bulimba

Election results

References

Further reading

External links
 Electorate profile (Antony Green, ABC)

Bulimba